Olmec Head Replica is installed in Salt Lake City, Utah, United States.

Description and history 
The grey limestone sculpture represents Mexico in Jordan Park's International Peace Gardens. It measures approximately 5.5 x 4.5 x 3.5 ft and rests on a cement and concrete base which measures approximately 4 in. x 5 ft. x 4 ft. The replica was surveyed by the Smithsonian Institution's "Save Outdoor Sculpture!" program in 1994.

See also

 Olmec colossal heads
 ''Olmec Head, Number 8

References

Limestone sculptures in the United States
Outdoor sculptures in Salt Lake City